Partridge Green was a railway station on the Steyning Line which served the village of Partridge Green.

The station closed as a result of the Beeching Axe in 1966 and now forms part of the Downs Link footpath.

The station buildings have been obliterated by housing and the Star Road Industrial Estate.

See also 

 List of closed railway stations in Britain

References 

Disused railway stations in West Sussex
Railway stations in Great Britain opened in 1861
Railway stations in Great Britain closed in 1966
Beeching closures in England
1861 establishments in England
1966 disestablishments in England
Former London, Brighton and South Coast Railway stations